This is a bibliography of works related the subject of tourism.

Tourism is travel for recreational, leisure or business purposes. The World Tourism Organization defines tourists as people "traveling to and staying in places outside their usual environment for not more than one consecutive year for leisure, business and other purposes".

Dictionaries
Dictionary of Travel, Tourism and Hospitality,  S. Medik, ed. Butterworth, 2003
A Dictionary of Travel and Tourism Terminology, A. Beaver. CABI, 2005
Dictionary of Concepts in Recreation and Leisure Studies, S. Smith, ed. Greenwood Press, 1990
Dictionary of Travel, Tourism and Hospitality Terms, R. Harris and J. Howard. Hospitality Press, 1996
The Tourism Society's Dictionary for Tourism Industry, V. R. Collins, ed. CABI, 2008
The Travel Dictionary, C. Deruaes, ed. Solitaire Publishing 1989
The Traveler's World: A Dictionary of Industry and Destination Literacy, N. Starr and S. Norwood. Prenctice Hall, 1996

Encyclopedias
Encyclopedia of Leisure and Outdoor Recreation, J. Jenkins and J. Pigram, eds. Routledge2003
The Encyclopedia of Ecotourism, D. Weaver ed. CABI, 2001
International Encyclopedia of Hospitality Management, A. Pizam, ed. Elsevier, 2005
Encyclopedia of Tourism, J. Jafari, ed. Routledge, 2000
Encyclopedia of Social and Cultural Anthropology, A. Barnard and J. Spencer, eds. Routledge, 1996

Research methods
Altinay L & Paraskevas A (2008) Planning research in hospitality and tourism (Butterworth-Heinemann)
Brotherton, B. (2008) Researching Hospitality and Tourism: A Student Guide (Sage Publications),
 Hsu, Cathy H.C. and William C Gartner, eds. The Routledge handbook of tourism research (2012) excerpt.
Jennings, G. (2006) Tourism Research (John Wiley & Sons, Australia).,
Veal, A. J, (2006) Research Methods for Leisure and Tourism: A Practical Guide, 3rd ed (Prentice Hall),
Smith, S. (2010) Practical Tourism Research  (CABI).
Cudny, W., Gosik, B., Piech, M., Rouba, R. (2011) Praca dyplomowa z turystyki podręcznik akademicki (The rules of writing master's thesis in tourism), LTN, Lodz.

Tourism and technology
Buhalis, D., 2003, eTourism: Information Technology for strategic tourism management, Pearson.
Buhalis, D., A.M. Tjoa and J. Jafari 1998, Information and Communication Technologies in tourism, ENTER'98 Conference Proceedings, Istanbul, Springer-Verlag, Wien-New York.
Buhalis, D., and Schertler, W., 1999, Information and Communication Technologies in tourism, ENTER'99, Springer-Verlag, Wien-New York, .
Fesenmaier D., Klein, S., and Buhalis, D., 2000, Information & Communication Technologies in tourism, ENTER'2000, Springer-Verlag, Wien-New York, .
Fesenmaier, D., Werthner, H., Wober, K, 2006, Destination Recommendation Systems: Behavioural Foundations and Applications HB  0851990231, CABI, London.
Frew A., O'Connor P, Hitz M.(Eds), 2003, Information and Communication Technologies in Tourism, Springer-Verlag Vienna  
Frew A., (Editor) 2004, Information and Communication Technologies in Tourism 2004, Springer-Verlag Vienna  
Frew A., (Editor) 2005, Information and Communication Technologies in Tourism: Proceedings of the International Conference in Innsbruck, Austria, Springer-Verlag Vienna 
Gary Inkpen 1998,Information Technology for Travel and Tourism, Longman, 
Mills, M. and Rob Law (Editors), 2005, Handbook of Consumer Behaviour, Tourism and the Internet  Haworth Press Inc.,U.S.  
Kärcher, K, 1997, Reinventing Package Holiday Business, DeutscherUniversitätsVerlag, Berlin.
Laudon, K.,  2004, E-Commerce: Business. Technology. Society.: Case Book Update, Prentice Hall,  
Lawrence, E., Newton, S., Corbitt, B., Braithwaite, R., Parker, C., 2002, Technology of internet business, Wiley, Australia.
Marcussen, Carl H. 1999, Internet Distribution of European Travel and Tourism Services, Research Centre of Bornholm, Denmark https://web.archive.org/web/20070808023346/http://www.crt.dk/Pdf/Rep/0063.pdf
Marcussen, Carl H. 2006, Internet and Distribution of European Travel Updates, Centre for Regional and Tourism Research, Denmark https://web.archive.org/web/20110126112719/http://www.crt.dk/uk/staff/chm/P_CHM.htm
Mills, M. and Rob Law (Editors), 2005, Handbook of Consumer Behaviour, Tourism and the Internet  Haworth Press Inc.,U.S.  
Nyheim, P., McFadden, F., Connolly, D.,2005, Technology strategies for the hospitality industry, Pearson-Prentice Hall, New Jersey.
O'Connor, P., 1999, Electronic information distribution in tourism and hospitality, Oxford: CAB.
O'Connor P., 2004,Using Computers in Hospitality Thomson Learning  
Poon, A., 1993, Tourism, technology and competitive strategies, Oxford: CAB International.
Porter, M, 2001, Strategy and the Internet, Harvard Business Review, March, pp. 62–78
Sheldon, P., 1997, Tourism Information Technology, CAB, Oxford 
Sheldon, P.J. Wöber,K.,  Fesenmaier D.R. (Eds) 2001, Information and Communication Technologies in Tourism 2001: Proceedings of the International Conference in Montreal, Canada, 2001: Springer-Verlag Vienna   
Sheldon, P, 1997, Tourism Information Technology, CABI Publishing, Oxford, England, 
Werthner, H. and Klein, S., (1999) Information Technology and Tourism-A challenging relationship, Springer, New York.
Wöber, K.W. A.J. Frew  M. Hitz (Editors) 2002, Information and Communication Technologies in Tourism 2002:Springer-Verlag Vienna  
WTO, 1999,Marketing tourism destinations online:strategies for the information age, World Tourism Organization, Madrid.
WTO, 1994, Global Distribution Systems in the Tourism Industry, World Tourism Organisation, Madrid.
WTO,2001, eBusiness for Tourism: Practical; guidelines for destinations and businesses, Madrid: World Tourism Organisation.

History of tourism
 Battilani, Patrizia, et al. "Discussion: teaching tourism history." Journal of Tourism History 8.1 (2016): 57-84.
 Boyer, M. Histoire de l'invention du tourisme. La Tour d'Aigues (2000). 
 Culver, Lawrence. The Frontier of Leisure: Southern California And The Shaping Of Modern America (2012).
 Endy, Christopher. Cold War Holidays (2004).
 Foubert, Lien. "Men and women tourists’ desire to see the world: ‘curiosity’ and ‘a longing to learn’ as (self-) fashioning motifs (first–fifth centuries CE)."  Journal of Tourism History 10.1 (2018): 5-20. online
Ghodsee, Kristen R. The Red Riviera: Gender, Tourism and Postsocialism on the Black Sea (Duke University Press, 2005).
 Gyr, Ueli. "The history of tourism: structures on the path to modernity." Notes 2.8 (2010).  online
 Law, Michael John. Not Like Home: American Visitors to Britain in the 1950s (McGill-Queen's University Press, 2019) online review.
 Merrill, Dennis.  Negotiating Paradise (2009), post 1945.
 Newman, Harvey K. Southern hospitality: Tourism and the growth of Atlanta (1999).
 Polat, Hasan Ali, and Aytuğ Arslan. "The rise of popular tourism in the Holy Land: Thomas Cook and John Mason Cook's enterprise skills that shaped the travel industry." Tourism Management 75 (2019): 231-244.
 Reynolds, Daniel P. Postcards from Auschwitz: Holocaust tourism and the meaning of remembrance (NYU Press, 2018).
 Rice, Mark. Making Machu Picchu: The Politics of Tourism in Twentieth-Century Peru (UNC Press Books, 2018).
 Towner, John. "The grand tour: A key phase in the history of tourism." Annals of tourism research 12.3 (1985): 297-333.
 Vukonic, Boris. "An outline of the history of tourism theory." in The Routledge handbook of tourism research ed. Cathy Hsu (2012).
 Weir, Brian. "Climate change and tourism–Are we forgetting lessons from the past?." Journal of Hospitality and Tourism Management 32 (2017): 108-114.
 Zuelow, Eric. A history of modern tourism (Macmillan International Higher Education, 2015).

References

External links
 

Tourism

Tourism-related lists